I Viceré is a 2007 Italian historical drama film directed by Roberto Faenza. It is based on the novel with the same name written by Federico De Roberto. For his performance Lando Buzzanca won the Globo d'oro for best actor. The film also won four David di Donatello awards and two Silver Ribbons.

Plot 
Uzeda, a Sicilian family faithful to the Bourbon kings, with the Unification of Italy in 1861 and the rise to power of Giuseppe Garibaldi and Vittorio Emanuele II, begins to lose his power, although Sicily remains in the hands of Prince Giacomo (Giacomo Uzeda).

Cast 
Alessandro Preziosi: Consalvo
Lando Buzzanca: Principe Giacomo
Cristiana Capotondi: Teresa
Guido Caprino: Giovannino
Assumpta Serna: Duchessa Radalì
Magdalena Grochowska: Donna Isabella
Sebastiano Lo Monaco: Duca Gaspare 
Lucia Bosè: Ferdinanda
Anna Marcello: Chiara
Giovanni Morassutti: Cantante lirico Romeo

See also   
 List of Italian films of 2007

References

External links

2007 films
Films directed by Roberto Faenza
Films based on Italian novels
Films about families
Films set in 1861
Films set in Sicily
Films shot in Italy
Italian historical drama films
2000s historical drama films
2000s Italian-language films
2000s Italian films